The Freehold Township Schools serve students in pre-kindergarten through eighth grade from Freehold Township, in Monmouth County, New Jersey, United States.

As of the 2018–19 school year, the district, comprising eight schools, had an enrollment of 3,737 students and 329.6 classroom teachers (on an FTE basis), for a student–teacher ratio of 11.3:1.

The district is classified by the New Jersey Department of Education as being in District Factor Group "GH", the third-highest of eight groupings. District Factor Groups organize districts statewide to allow comparison by common socioeconomic characteristics of the local districts. From lowest socioeconomic status to highest, the categories are A, B, CD, DE, FG, GH, I and J.

Students in ninth through twelfth grades attend either Freehold Township High School or Freehold High School (based on home address), as part of the Freehold Regional High School District. The district also serves students from Colts Neck Township, Englishtown, Farmingdale, Freehold Borough, Howell Township, Manalapan Township and Marlboro Township. Freehold Township High School is home to the Contemporary Global Studies Learning Center and Freehold High School hosts the Medical Sciences Learning Center; each program admits students on a selective basis from all over the Freehold Regional High School District. As of the 2018–19 school year, Freehold Township High School had an enrollment of 2,043 students and 137.3 classroom teachers (on an FTE basis), for a student–teacher ratio of 14.9:1, while Freehold Borough High School had an enrollment of 1,422 students and 103.8 classroom teachers (on an FTE basis), for a student–teacher ratio of 13.7:1.

Schools 
Schools in the district (with 2018–19 enrollment data from the National Center for Education Statistics) are:

 Elementary schools
Early Childhood Learning Center (97 students; in grades PreK). The Principal is Rebecca Montgomery.
C. Richard Applegate School (424; K-5). The Principal is Brad Millaway. The school is named for Charles Richard Applegate.
Joseph J. Catena School (488; K-5). The Principal is Traci Shaw. The school is named for Joseph J. Catena, their first principal, who served for 38 years. It was built in 1961 and is the oldest school in Freehold that is still being used as an elementary school.
Laura Donovan School (436; K-5). The Laura Donovan School was built in 1968. It was named in honor of Laura Donovan who taught in Freehold Township for 54 years. The school principal is Jennifer Benbrook.
Marshall W. Errickson School (435; K-5). Marshall Errickson School was built in 1972. The Principal is Cathleen Areman. Errickson is split between Eisenhower and Barkalow.
West Freehold School (501; K-5). The Principal is Dr. Edward Aldarelli. WFS was the first school in the district. It started out as a one room schoolhouse, around the turn-of-the century, located on Wemrock Road, which was before the establishment of the district. In 1936, the WFS was incorporated into the school district was opened on Stilwells Corner Road, next to the present-day Barkalow Middle School. It had gone through many additions and renovations over the next 70 years, to accommodate the growing population. In 2004, The New West Freehold School was built, and many students were re-districted to go to this school. The first graduating class of 2005 buried a time capsule for future generations. The Old West Freehold School went through another renovation, to incorporate the Early Childhood Learning Center (ECLC) and the district's offices.
 Middle schools
Clifton T. Barkalow School (661; 6-8), gets most students in Laura Donovan and West Freehold. Barkalow was the first middle school in the district when it was built in 1964. The Principal is Thomas Smith.
Dwight D. Eisenhower Middle School (686; 6-8), gets most students from Applegate and Catena. The Principal is Lori Gambino. It first opened its doors in 1971. It is located directly next door to the Joseph J. Catena School.

Administration
Core members of the district's administration are:
Neal Dickstein, Superintendent
Robert DeVita, Business Administrator / Board Secretary

Board of education
The district's board of education, with nine members, sets policy and oversees the fiscal and educational operation of the district through its administration. As a Type II school district, the board's trustees are elected directly by voters to serve three-year terms of office on a staggered basis, with three seats up for election each year held (since 2012) as part of the November general election. The board appoints a superintendent to oversee the day-to-day operation of the district.

References

External links
Freehold Township Schools website

School Data for the Freehold Township Schools, National Center for Education Statistics
Freehold Boro High School
Freehold Township High School
Freehold Regional High School District

Freehold Township, New Jersey
New Jersey District Factor Group GH
School districts in Monmouth County, New Jersey